is a railway station on the Nippō Main Line operated by Kyūshū Railway Company in Usa, Ōita, Japan.

Lines

Layout 
The station consists of a side and an island platform serving three tracks. The station building is a modern concrete block structure with a colour scheme chosen to match the Usa Jingū shrine. Facilities include a staffed ticket window, a waiting area and lockers. Access to the island platform is by means of a footbridge.

Management of the station has been outsourced to the JR Kyushu Tetsudou Eigyou Co., a wholly owned subsidiary of JR Kyushu specialising in station services. It staffs the ticket booth which is equipped with a Midori no Madoguchi facility.

Adjacent stations

History
The Kyushu Railway was nationalised on 1 July 1907. Japanese Government Railways (JGR), designated the track as the Hōshū Main Line on 12 October 1909 and expanded it southwards, with Usa opening as the new southern terminus on 21 December 1909. On 15 December 1923, the Hōshū Main Line was renamed the Nippō Main Line. With the privatization of Japanese National Railways (JNR), the successor of JGR, on 1 April 1987, the station came under the control of JR Kyushu.

Passenger statistics
In fiscal 2016, the station was used by an average of 423 passengers daily (boarding passengers only), and it ranked 263rd among the busiest stations of JR Kyushu.

Surrounding area
Usa Jingū

See also
List of railway stations in Japan

References

External links

  

Railway stations in Ōita Prefecture
Railway stations in Japan opened in 1909